Gary L. Randall is a Republican politician from Michigan who currently serves as the clerk of the Michigan House of Representatives. Randall has served as either clerk or assistant clerk since 1999. Prior to his service as clerk, Randall was a member of the House, representing parts of mid-Michigan from 1979 to 1996.

On June 3, 2013, Randall was appointed the Griffin Endowed Chair in American Government at Central Michigan University.

References

Living people
1943 births
Republican Party members of the Michigan House of Representatives
People from Gratiot County, Michigan
Central Michigan University alumni
Central Michigan University faculty
Michigan State University alumni
Legislative clerks
20th-century American politicians
21st-century American politicians